Johann Kaspar Hechtel (1 May 1771 – 20 December 1799) was a German businessman, owner of a brass factory in Nuremberg, non-fiction writer and designer of parlour games including the prototype for the Petit Lenormand cartomancy deck. According to published biographies, Hechtel also contributed anonymously to some treatises on physics.

Early life
Hechtel was born on 1 May 1771 in Nuremberg.

Death
Hechtel died on 20 December 1799 in Nuremberg during a smallpox epidemic and was survived by a wife.

Works
Sammlung freundschaftlicher Denkmale und kleine Lehren der Weisheit und Tugend. Zum Gebrauch in Stammbücher und zur Geistes- und Sittenveredlung junger Leute bestimmt. (Bieling, 1798)
Second edition: Denkmale der Freundschaft und kleine Lehren der Weisheit und Tugend, zum Gebrauch in Stammbücher und Geistes- und Sittenveredlung junger Leute (Bieling, 1803)
Third edition: Denkmale der Freundschaft für Stammbücher und moralische Lehren zur Sittenveredlung junger Personen (Bieling, 1809)
Fourth edition: Denkmale der Freundschaft für Stammbücher und moralische Lehren zur Sittenveredlung junger Personen (Bieling, 1819)
Beiträge zur geselligen Freude oder Auswahl neuer Karten- Pfänder- und Unterhaltungsspiele zum Nutzen und Vergnügen, mit illumirten Kupfern (Bieling, 1798)
Pandora, ein neues Würfel- und Gesellschaftspiel mit 24 Fragen und 144 scherzhaften Antworten (Bieling, 1798)
Das Spiel der Hoffnung, eine angenehme Gesellschaftsunterhaltung mit 36 neuen illumirten Figurenkarten, franz. und deutsch (Le Jeu de l'Esperance, accompagné d'un nouveau jeu de cartes à figures) (Bieling, c1799)

Das Spiel der Hoffnung Deck (c.1799)

In the mid 19th century after the death of the famous French fortune-teller Marie Anne Lenormand, Lenormand's name was used on several cartomancy decks including a deck of 36 illustrated cards known as the Petit Lenormand or simply Lenormand cards still used extensively today. The 36 card Lenormand deck is modeled on a deck of cards published c1799 as part of Das Spiel der Hoffnung (The Game of Hope), a game of chance designed by Hechtel which was still being advertised in 1820. So-called Lenormand decks have the same card numbering, primary symbols and playing card associations as the cards in Hechtel's Das Spiel der Hoffnung game. Some examples of the game are included in an extensive collection of playing cards bequeathed to the British Museum by Lady Charlotte Schreiber. Das Spiel der Hoffnung is listed among Hechtel's works in an advertisement by publisher Gustav Philipp Jakob Bieling of Nuremberg dated 1799.

The "Game of Hope" cards usually have their playing card equivalents displayed in the upper field or worked into the design, with either the German or French suits being used. Swiss decks (like the first editions of the "Game of Hope") had both the equivalent German and French cards in the upper field. It only uses the 2, 6, 7, 8, 9, 10, Jack, Queen, and King of each suit, uses the Deuce (2 card) in the place of the Ace, and doesn't have Jokers.

The game can also be played with standard decks. The 54-card French deck discards both Jokers and the 2, 3, 4, and 5 of each suit, keeping the Ace and the Face Cards (King, Queen, and Jack). The 48-card German deck discards the 3, 4, and 5 of each suit. The German deck doesn't use Aces and renames the 2 as the Ass ("Ace") or Daus ("Deuce"), the 10 as the Panier ("Banner"), the Jack as the Unter (Untermann or "Lesser Knave", a sergeant or footman with the suit pip at the lower corner of the field), and the Queen as the Ober (Obermann or "Greater Knave", a knight or officer with the suit pip at the upper corner of the field). The King (or Koenig) of each suit is shown crowned and holding a scepter and has one or two suit pips in the upper field.

References

External links
British Museum: Das Spiel der Hofnung
Tarot History Forum discussion thread: German Lenormand 1846 / Spiel der Hoffnung 1799

German non-fiction writers
Board game designers
Playing cards
Cartomancy
Divination
Businesspeople from Nuremberg
1771 births
1799 deaths
Deaths from smallpox
German male non-fiction writers